Mont Tremblant Airport may refer to:

Mont-Tremblant International Airport
Mont-Tremblant/Saint-Jovite Airport
Mont-Tremblant/Lac Duhamel Water Aerodrome
Mont-Tremblant/Lac Ouimet Water Aerodrome
Mont-Tremblant/Heliport P3 and Mont-Tremblant/Saint-Jovite Héli-Tremblant Heliport, two heliports in Canada